Hello is the debut album by South London five-piece, The Capes. It was released by Hard Soul Records mid-October 2005 in the UK and on February 28, 2006, in the US.

The album sees the band expanding on the promise of their 2005 Taste EP, fusing catchy Britpop-style hooks with complex arrangements, harmonies and splashes of synth.

Track listing (UK & US)
Mexican Broads
Super Girls
What You Want
Carly 
First Base
Francophile (Version 1.5)
Shinjuki Hi-5
Comet Tails
Tightly Wound
Stately Homes
Gimme
Sun Roof

2005 albums